As of 2011, the National Association of Intercollegiate Hockey (NAIH) has 19 member institutions. The following colleges and universities are members of the NAIH for ice hockey competition:

"#" - Indicates an institution that holds concurrent membership in the American Collegiate Hockey Association

United States

California 
California has four member institutions.
 Chapman University
 UC San Diego
 UC Santa Barbara
 Ventura College

Connecticut 
Connecticut has one member institution.
 Yale University#

Idaho 
Idaho has one member institution.
 University of Idaho

Kentucky 
Kentucky has one member institution.
 Northern Kentucky University#

Massachusetts 
Massachusetts has one member institution.
 Middlesex Community College

New Hampshire 
New Hampshire has two member institutions.
 Dartmouth College
 Southern New Hampshire University

New York 
New York has seven member institutions.
 Clarkson University
 D'Youville College
 Hamilton College
 Le Moyne College
 Saint Lawrence University
 State University of New York at Canton
 State University of New York at Oneonta
 Union College

Ohio 
Ohio has one member institution.
 Denison University

Oregon 
Oregon has one member institution.
 Portland State University

Pennsylvania 
Pennsylvania has two member institutions.
 Allegheny College
 Gannon University

South Dakota 
South Dakota has one member institution.
 University of South Dakota

West Virginia 
West Virginia has three member institutions.
 Marshall University
 West Liberty University
 Wheeling Jesuit University

Washington 
Washington has two member institution
 Western Washington University
 Eastern Washington University

See also
 List of NCAA Division I Institutions
 List of NCAA Division II Institutions
 List of NCAA Division III Institutions

References

Institutions